State Route 146 (SR 146) is an east-west state highway in the eastern portion of the U.S. state of Ohio. It runs  from SR 16 near Nashport to SR 78 in Summerfield.

Major intersections

References

146
Transportation in Licking County, Ohio
Transportation in Muskingum County, Ohio
Transportation in Guernsey County, Ohio
Transportation in Noble County, Ohio